Sandra Adair (born 1952) is an American film editor who has worked with director Richard Linklater since 1993.

Life and career 
Sandra B. Adair (born Estrin) was born in Carlsbad, New Mexico, the daughter of Rachel and Herman Estrin. Her family moved to Las Vegas in the early 1960s.

Adair later lived in Los Angeles. In 1978, she married television director and filmmaker Dwight R. Adair (Dallas; Dynasty). In the beginning of her career she often worked as assistant editor for her brother, Robert Estrin. Together they worked on films and documentary features such as Desert Hearts (1985), Creation of the Universe (1985), What Happened to Kerouac? (1986) or Internal Affairs (1990). In 1991 she moved to Austin, Texas. Since 1993 she has edited all of Richard Linklater's films, and has co-produced some of them.

Adair received the ACE Eddie Award for her editing of Boyhood (directed by Richard Linklater - 2014). She was also nominated for the Academy Award for Best Film Editing for the film.

Adair is a member of the Academy of Motion Picture Arts and Sciences, of American Cinema Editors (A.C.E.) and Austin Film Society.

Selected filmography 
 1986: Maricela (TV movie)
 1988: The Telephone
 1990: Smoothtalker
 1993: Dazed and Confused
 1994: The Return of the Texas Chainsaw Massacre
 1995: Before Sunrise
 1996: SubUrbia
 1998: The Newton Boys
 1998: They Come at Night
 2001: Waking Life
 2001: Tape
 2003: Rolling Kansas
 2003: Sexless
 2003: School of Rock
 2004: Before Sunset
 2004: $5.15/Hr. (TV movie)
 2005: Bad News Bears
 2006: Fast Food Nation
 2006: A Scanner Darkly
 2007: Elvis and Anabelle
 2008: Inning by Inning: A Portrait of a Coach (documentary)
 2008: Me and Orson Welles
 2010: Everything Must Go
 2011: Bernie
 2012: Sushi − The Global Catch (documentary)
 2012: Shepard & Dark (documentary)
 2013: Before Midnight
 2014: Boyhood
 2016: Everybody Wants Some!!
 2017: Last Flag Flying
 2019: Where'd You Go, Bernadette
 2022: Apollo 10 1⁄2: A Space Age Childhood

See also
List of film director and editor collaborations

References

Further reading

External links 
 

1952 births
Living people
American Cinema Editors
American film editors
American women film editors
People from Carlsbad, New Mexico
21st-century American women